Elis Wiklund (12 December 1909 – 15 March 1982) was a Swedish cross-country skier who won the 50 km race at the 1934 FIS Nordic World Ski Championships and 1936 Winter Olympics.

Wiklund won two individual Swedish titles: in the 30 km in 1938 and in the 50 km in 1941. He was an accomplished accordion player, and produced records in 1936. In 1946 he briefly worked as a skiing coach in Switzerland, and after returning opened a sports shop in Sollefteå. Later he became an owner of a ski wax factory. His life was featured in the novel Hjältedrömmen (A Hero’s Dream) by Karl-Erik Johansson.

Cross-country skiing results
All results are sourced from the International Ski Federation (FIS).

Olympic Games
 1 medal – (1 gold)

World Championships
 1 medal – (1 gold)

References

External links
 

1909 births
1982 deaths
People from Kramfors Municipality
Cross-country skiers from Västernorrland County
Swedish male cross-country skiers
Cross-country skiers at the 1936 Winter Olympics
Olympic medalists in cross-country skiing
FIS Nordic World Ski Championships medalists in cross-country skiing
Medalists at the 1936 Winter Olympics
Olympic gold medalists for Sweden